Boeing Starliner-1 also called Post Certification Mission-1 (PCM-1) is planned to be the first operational crew mission of the Boeing Starliner to the International Space Station (ISS) as part of the Commercial Crew Program. It would be the fourth orbital flight mission of the Starliner overall. It is scheduled to launch no earlier than 2024, transporting members of a future ISS Expedition.

Crew 
As this marks the first operational flight of Starliner, a Russian cosmonaut is not expected to be on board as Roscosmos has stated they do not want to put Russian cosmonauts on Starliner until it has flown successful Commercial Crew Program flights. On 21 May 2021 NASA announced JAXA astronaut Koichi Wakata as the fourth member of the crew, in cooperation with JAXA as NASA's international partner, but in October 2021 reassigned him to the October 2022 SpaceX Crew-5 mission.

On 18 April 2022, NASA said that it has not finalized which of the cadre of Starliner astronauts, including Barry Wilmore, Michael Fincke, and Sunita Williams, will fly on the CFT mission or this mission. On 16 June 2022, NASA confirmed that CFT will be a two-person flight test, and Williams will be reassigned for the CFT mission. NASA astronaut Jeanette Epps continues to prepare for an upcoming long duration mission aboard Starliner-1. NASA also has identified backup flight opportunities for Epps on the SpaceX Crew Dragon spacecraft for additional scheduling and resource flexibility. Epps has begun cross-training on the SpaceX Crew Dragon spacecraft to prepare for this possibility.

On 30 September 2022, Scott D. Tingle was assigned as commander and Michael Fincke as pilot.

Mission 
This mission was to be the first reuse of a Starliner spacecraft. That vehicle was initially flown as the first uncrewed Orbital Flight Test mission in December 2019. On 22 December 2019, commander Sunita Williams announced the name "Calypso" for the spacecraft. Calypso will now be used for Boe-CFT instead. Spacecraft 2, which was used for Starliner Orbital Flight Test-2 will instead be flying this mission.

Jeanette Epps was added to the Starliner-1 mission on 25 August 2020. Koichi Wakata was officially added to the Starliner-1 mission on 21 May 2021 but then reassigned to SpaceX Crew-5 mission in October 2022.

Michael Fincke was assigned as back-up for Sunita Williams on Boe-CFT.

See also 
 SpaceX Dragon 2
 Boeing Starliner
 Boeing Starliner Spacecraft 2

References 

2024 in spaceflight
Future human spaceflights
Boeing Starliner
2024 in the United States